Japan is divided into 47 prefectures (todōfuken), which rank immediately below the national government and form the country's first level of jurisdiction and administrative division. They include 43  prefectures proper (ken), two urban prefectures (fu: Osaka and Kyoto), one "circuit" or "territory" (dō: Hokkai-dō) and one metropolis (to: Tokyo). 
In 1868, the Meiji Fuhanken sanchisei administration created the first prefectures (urban fu and rural ken) to replace the urban and rural administrators (bugyō, daikan, etc.) in the parts of the country previously controlled directly by the shogunate and a few territories of rebels/shogunate loyalists who had not submitted to the new government such as Aizu/Wakamatsu. In 1871, all remaining feudal domains (han) were also transformed into prefectures, so that prefectures subdivided the whole country. In several waves of territorial consolidation, today's 47 prefectures were formed by the turn of the century. In many instances, these are contiguous with the ancient ritsuryō provinces of Japan.

Each prefecture's chief executive is a directly elected . Ordinances and budgets are enacted by a unicameral  whose members are elected for four-year terms.

Some other prefectures also have branch offices that carry out prefectural administrative functions outside the capital. Tokyo, the capital of Japan, is a merged city-prefecture; a metropolis, it has features of both cities and prefectures.

Background 

The West's use of "prefecture" to label these Japanese regions stems from 16th-century Portuguese explorers' and traders' use of "prefeitura" to describe the fiefdoms they encountered there. Its original sense in Portuguese, however, was closer to "municipality" than "province". Today, in turn, Japan uses its word ken, meaning "prefecture", to identify Portuguese districts while in Brazil the word "Prefeitura" is used to refer to a city hall.

Those fiefs were headed by a local warlord or family. Though the fiefs have long since been dismantled, merged, and reorganized multiple times, and been granted legislative governance and oversight, the rough translation stuck.

Although there were initially over 300 prefectures, many of them being former han territories, this number was reduced to 72 in the latter part of 1871, and 47 in 1888. The Local Autonomy Law of 1947 gave more political power to prefectures, and installed prefectural governors and parliaments.

In 2003, Prime Minister Junichiro Koizumi proposed that the government consolidate the current prefectures into about 10 regional states (so-called dōshūsei). The plan called for each region to have greater autonomy than existing prefectures. This process would reduce the number of subprefecture administrative regions and cut administrative costs. The Japanese government also considered a plan to merge several groups of prefectures, creating a subnational administrative division system consisting of between nine and 13 states, and giving these states more local autonomy than the prefectures currently enjoy. As of August 2012, this plan was abandoned.

Powers 

Japan is a unitary state. The central government delegates many functions (such as education and the police force) to the prefectures and municipalities, but retains the overall right to control them. Although local government expenditure accounts for 70 percent of overall government expenditure, the central government controls local budgets, tax rates, and borrowing.

Prefectural government functions include the organization of the prefectural police force, the supervision of schools and the maintenance of prefectural schools (mainly high schools), prefectural hospitals, prefectural roads, the supervision of prefectural waterways and regional urban planning. Their responsibilities include tasks delegated to them by the national government such as maintaining most ordinary national roads (except in designated major cities), and prefectures coordinate and support their municipalities in their functions. De facto, prefectures as well as municipalities have often been less autonomous than the formal extent of the local autonomy law suggests, because of
 most of them depend heavily on central government funding – a dependency recently further exacerbated in many regions by the demographic transition which hits rural areas harder/earlier as cities can offset it partly through migration from the countryside, and
 in many policy areas, the basic framework is set tightly by national laws, and prefectures and municipalities are only autonomous within that framework.

Types of prefecture 
Historically, during the Edo period, the Tokugawa shogunate established  around the nine largest cities in Japan, and 302  elsewhere. When the Meiji government began to create the prefectural system in 1868, the nine bugyō-ruled zones became , while the township-ruled zones and the rest of the bugyo-ruled zones became . Later, in 1871, the government designated Tokyo, Osaka, and Kyoto as fu, and relegated the other fu to the status of ken. During World War II, in 1943, Tokyo became a to, a new type of pseudo-prefecture.

Despite the differences in terminology, there is little functional difference between the four types of local governments.

To
The Japanese government translates  as "Tokyo Metropolis" in almost all cases, and the government is officially called the "Tokyo Metropolitan Government".

Following the capitulation of shogunate Edo in 1868, Tōkyō-fu (an urban prefecture like Kyoto and Osaka) was set up and encompassed the former city area of Edo under the Fuhanken sanchisei. After the abolition of the han system in the first wave of prefectural mergers in 1871/72, several surrounding areas (parts of Urawa, Kosuge, Shinagawa and Hikone prefectures) were merged into Tokyo, and under the system of (numbered) "large districts and small districts" (daiku-shōku), it was subdivided into eleven large districts further subdivided into 103 small districts, six of the large districts (97 small districts) covered the former city area of Edo. When the ancient ritsuryō districts were reactivated as administrative units in 1878, Tokyo was subdivided into 15 [urban] districts (-ku) and initially six [rural] districts (-gun; nine after the Tama transfer from Kanagawa in 1893, eight after the merger of East Tama and South Toshima into Toyotama in 1896). Both urban and rural districts, like everywhere in the country, were further subdivided into urban units/towns/neighbourhoods (-chō/-machi) and rural units/villages (-mura/-son). The yet unincorporated communities on the Izu (previously part of Shizuoka) and Ogasawara (previously directly Home Ministry-administrated) island groups became also part of Tokyo in the 19th century. When the modern municipalities – [district-independent] cities and [rural] districts containing towns and villages – were introduced under the Yamagata-Mosse laws on local government and the simultaneous Great Meiji merger was performed in 1889, the 15 -ku became wards of Tokyo City, initially Tokyo's only independent city (-shi), the six rural districts of Tokyo were consolidated in 85 towns and villages. In 1893, the three Tama districts and their 91 towns and villages became part of Tokyo. As Tokyo city's suburbs grew rapidly in the early 20th century, many towns and villages in Tokyo were merged or promoted over the years. In 1932, five complete districts with their 82 towns and villages were merged into Tokyo City and organised in 20 new wards. Also, by 1940, there were two more cities in Tokyo: Hachiōji City and Tachikawa City.

In 1943, Tokyo City was abolished, Tōkyō-fu became Tōkyō-to, and Tokyo-shi's 35 wards remained Tokyo-to's 35 wards, but submunicipal authorities of Tokyo-shi's wards which previously fell directly under the municipality, with the municipality now abolished, fell directly under prefectural or now "Metropolitan" authority. All other cities, towns and villages in Tokyo-fu stayed cities, towns and villages in Tokyo-to. The reorganisation's aim was to consolidate the administration of the area around the capital by eliminating the extra level of authority in Tokyo. Also, the governor was no longer called chiji, but chōkan (~"head/chief [usually: of a central government agency]") as in Hokkaidō). The central government wanted to have greater control over all local governments due to Japan's deteriorating position in World War II – for example, all mayors in the country became appointive as in the Meiji era – and over Tokyo in particular, due to the possibility of emergency in the metropolis.

After the war, Japan was forced to decentralise Tokyo again, following the general terms of democratisation outlined in the Potsdam Declaration. Many of Tokyo's special governmental characteristics disappeared during this time, and the wards took on an increasingly municipal status in the decades following the surrender. Administratively, today's special wards are almost indistinguishable from other municipalities.

The postwar reforms also changed the map of Tokyo significantly: In 1947, the 35 wards were reorganised into the 23 special wards, because many of its citizens had either died during the war, left the city, or been drafted and did not return. In the occupation reforms, special wards, each with their own elected assemblies (kugikai) and mayors (kuchō), were intended to be equal to other municipalities even if some restrictions still applied. (For example, there was during the occupation a dedicated municipal police agency for the 23 special wards/former Tokyo City, yet the special wards public safety commission was not named by the special ward governments, but by the government of the whole "Metropolis". In 1954, independent municipal police forces were abolished generally in the whole country, and the prefectural/"Metropolitan" police of Tokyo is again responsible for the whole prefecture/"Metropolis" and like all prefectural police forces controlled by the prefectural/"Metropolitan" public safety commission whose members are appointed by the prefectural/"Metropolitan" governor and assembly.) But, as part of the "reverse course" of the 1950s some of these new rights were removed, the most obvious measure being the denial of directly elected mayors. Some of these restrictions were removed again over the decades. But it was not until the year 2000 that the special wards were fully recognised as municipal-level entities.

Independently from these steps, as Tokyo's urban growth again took up pace during the postwar economic miracle and most of the main island part of Tokyo "Metropolis" became increasingly core part of the Tokyo metropolitan area, many of the other municipalities in Tokyo have transferred some of their authority to the Metropolitan government. For example, the Tokyo Fire Department which was only responsible for the 23 special wards until 1960 has until today taken over the municipal fire departments in almost all of Tokyo. A joint governmental structure for the whole Tokyo metropolitan area (and not only the western suburbs of the special wards which are part of the Tokyo prefecture/Metropolis") as advocated by some politicians such as former Kanagawa governor Shigefumi Matsuzawa has not been established (see also Dōshūsei). Existing cross-prefectural fora of cooperation between local governments in the Tokyo metropolitan area are the Kantō regional governors' association (Kantō chihō chijikai) and the "Shutoken summit" (formally "conference of chief executives of nine prefectures and cities", 9 to-ken-shi shunō kaigi). But, these are not themselves local public entities under the local autonomy law and national or local government functions cannot be directly transferred to them, unlike the "Union of Kansai governments" (Kansai kōiki-rengō) which has been established by several prefectural governments in the Kansai region.

But the only functional difference between Tōkyō-to and other prefectures is that Tokyo administers wards as well as cities. Today, since the special wards have almost the same degree of independence as Japanese cities, the difference in administration between Tokyo and other prefectures is fairly minor.

In Osaka, several prominent politicians led by Tōru Hashimoto, then mayor of Osaka City and former governor of Osaka Prefecture, proposed an Osaka Metropolis plan, under which Osaka City, and possibly other neighboring cities, would be replaced by special wards similar to Tokyo's. The plan was narrowly defeated in a 2015 referendum, and again in 2020.

Dō
This term was originally used to refer to Japanese regions consisting of several provinces (e.g. the Tōkaidō east-coast region, and Saikaido west-coast region). This was also a historical usage of the character in China. (In Korea, this historical usage is still used today and was kept during the period of Japanese rule.)

, the only remaining dō today, was not one of the original seven dō (it was known as Ezo in the pre-modern era). Its current name is believed to originate from Matsuura Takeshiro, an early Japanese explorer of the island. Since Hokkaidō did not fit into the existing dō classifications, a new dō was created to cover it.

These were consolidated into a single  in 1886, at prefectural level but organized more along the lines of a territory. In 1947, the department was dissolved, and Hokkaidō became a full-fledged prefecture. The -ken suffix was never added to its name, so the -dō suffix came to be understood to mean "prefecture".

When Hokkaidō was incorporated, transportation on the island was still underdeveloped, so the prefecture was split into several  that could fulfill administrative duties of the prefectural government and keep tight control over the developing island. These subprefectures still exist today, although they have much less power than they possessed before and during World War II. They now exist primarily to handle paperwork and other bureaucratic functions.

"Hokkaidō Prefecture" is, technically speaking, a redundant term because dō itself indicates a prefecture, although it is occasionally used to differentiate the government from the island itself. The prefecture's government calls itself the "Hokkaidō Government" rather than the "Hokkaidō Prefectural Government".

Fu
The Classical Chinese character from which this is derived implies a core urban zone of national importance. Before World War II, different laws applied to fu and ken, but this distinction was abolished after the war, and the two types of prefecture are now functionally the same.

Ken
The Classical Chinese character from which this is derived carries a rural or provincial connotation, and an analogous character is used to refer to the counties of China, counties of Taiwan and districts of Vietnam.

Lists of prefectures 

The different systems of parsing frame the ways in which Japanese prefectures are perceived:

By Japanese ISO

The prefectures are also often grouped into eight regions (Chihō). Those regions are not formally specified, they do not have elected officials, nor are they corporate bodies. But the practice of ordering prefectures based on their geographic region is traditional. This ordering is mirrored in Japan's International Organization for Standardization (ISO) coding. From north to south (numbering in ISO 3166-2:JP order), the prefectures of Japan and their commonly associated regions are:

 Hokkaidō 
 Tōhoku 
 Kantō 
 Chūbu 
 Kansai 
 Chūgoku 
 Shikoku 
 Kyūshū

By English name
The default alphabetic order in this sortable table can be altered to mirror the traditional Japanese regions and ISO parsing.

Former prefectures

1870s

1880s

Lost after World War II

Here are some territories that were lost after World War II. This does not include all the territories of the Empire of Japan such as Manchukuo.

See also 
 List of Japanese prefectural name etymologies
 List of Japanese prefectures by area
 List of Japanese prefectures by population
 List of Japanese prefectures by GDP
 List of Japanese prefectures by GDP per capita
 List of Japanese prefectures by Human Development Index
 List of Japanese prefectures by life expectancy
 List of Japanese prefectures by highest mountain
 List of prefectural capitals in Japan
 List of Prefecture songs of Japan
 ISO 3166-2 codes for Japan
 List of prefectural governors in Japan
 Flags of Japanese prefectures
 Provinces of Japan

General
 List of regions of Japan
 Government of Japan

References

External links 

 National Governors' Association website
 Map of Japan showing prefectures
 Japanese essay on types of prefectures
 CityMayors.com profile of prefectures

 
 1
Prefectures
Japan 1
Prefectures, Japan
Lists of places in Japan